The Valkyrians is a Finnish rocksteady and ska band.

In 2006 they released their debut album High and Mighty, which was popular on the radio and charted at #24 on the national Finnish album chart. One of the album's singles, "Rankin Fullstop", peaked at #6 on the singles chart.

The Valkyrians released a second album, The Beat of Our Street, in 2009. It reached #28 on the album chart.

Their third album Punkrocksteady was released on August 10, 2011. The album's songs are cover versions of the 70's and 80's punk and new wave bands' songs and a tribute to the early influencers (outside of ska, and reggae).

History 

In 2002, Angster, Moonhead, Big Deal, Letku Leroy and Gladiator met at a familiar watering hole in Helsinki, Finland. The musicians had known each other for years and decided to start a band inspired by the music of Jamaica. The first gig was set up for Big Deal's and Leroy's birthday party. Ska, rocksteady and reggae, as well as 2Tone and punk were played.

Their first release, an EP called Miracle by Semi Sounds/Fat Belt Records, came out in 2004. It featured "I Don't Wanna Go Home", which received a positive reception. High and Mighty was released in 2006 (BALE/Fat Belt). Thereafter, the band toured Scandinavia and central Europe. The album rose up to number 24 in the Finnish charts.
Another award was given by Finland's premier alternative rock magazine . "Do You Really Wanna Know" was named song of the year by Funky Elephant.

Stupido Records and Pork Pie Records released the band's second album, The Beat of Our Street, in 2009. It climbed up to number 29 in the charts. The band went on a tour that lasted the best part of a year: Finland, the Czech Republic, Germany, Austria, Poland, Slovenia, Croatia, the Netherlands, Belgium, and Sweden were toured by the band.

Punkrocksteady was released on August 10, 2011.

Band members 
Angster – vocals
John Building – bass
Mr Moonhead – piano, organ
Gladiator – guitar
Junior – drums

Former members
Big Deal – drums (2002–2013)
Letku Leroy – bass (2002–2018)

Discography

Albums 
High and Mighty, released February 6, 2006 by BALE Inc. licensed by Pork Pie Records
The Beat of Our Street, released September 30, 2009 by Stupido Records Oy licensed by Pork Pie Records
Punkrocksteady, released August 10, 2011 by Stupido Records Oy licensed by Pork Pie Records
Rock My Soul, released 2015
Monsterpiece, released 2022

Singles 
Miracle EP, released October 2004 by Semi Sounds/Fat Belt Records
Ranking Fullstop, 2006 BALE Inc.
Do You Really Wanna Know, 2007 BALE Inc.
Hooligans, 2007 BALE Inc.
Hold On Rudy, 2010 Stupido Records Oy
Heart of Glass, 2011 Stupido Records Oy

References

External links 

 

Finnish musical groups
Musical groups established in 2002
Rocksteady musical groups
Ska groups